Revelation is the fifth studio album by American deathcore band Oceano, released on May 19, 2017 as their first album for Sumerian Records.

Background 
On the album's overall basic concept, vocalist Adam Warren stated: "All of the songs are the recollections of a separate being as he travels through a portal of alternate timelines[...]Each track is another revelation that he’s viewed. The Ascendants have been watching society grow and lightly influencing it but allowing humans free will for the most part. In turn, what they’ve seen is humanity basically deplete the planet to a near state of destruction".

Track listing

Personnel 
Band line-up
Adam Warren – vocals
Scott Smith – guitars
Chris Wagner – bass
Andrew Holzbaur – drums

Production
Dusty Peterson - Artwork
Daniel McBride - A&R, Layout
Nick Walters - A&R
Nick Nativo - Producer, Engineer
Buster Odeholm - Mixing, Mastering
Scott Smith - Engineer

References 

2017 albums
Oceano (band) albums